Greg O'Connor is a composer and songwriter who has composed scores for over 30 television series and has written numerous featured songs for TV, films and commercials. He is a Primetime Emmy winner and a four-time Emmy nominee. He has scored projects including variety, single camera comedy, multi camera comedy, animation, one hour drama, game show, sketch comedy, award show, stand up, reality, hidden camera, documentary, commercials and virtual reality.

Early life
O'Connor was born in Philadelphia. O'Connor is a graduate of The University of Notre Dame’s Music School as well as the Scoring for Motion Pictures and Television Program at USC. He began studying music at age six, taking piano lessons at the Bryn Mawr Conservatory of Music in Bryn Mawr PA, a suburb of Philadelphia. O'Connor  also played alto saxophone for eight years. His education included performing in various ensembles, either as a pianist, saxophonist or vocalist, including concert band, jazz band, glee club and various top 40 bands throughout high school and college.

Career
Early in his career, O'Connor wrote the score for the Emmy Award-winning Ben Stiller Show and The Sunday Comics on FOX. He also composed the underscore for all three seasons of the hidden camera series The Jamie Kennedy Experiment and the ABC Aaron Spelling cop drama 10-8, starring Ernie Hudson and Danny Nucci.

He has written two Billboard Top 20 songs with collaborator James Pankow for the band Chicago, as well as the song "Here With Me" for the Chicago album Stone of Sisyphus. He produced five songs for the Barry Manilow album The Greatest Songs of the Eighties, as well as Manilow's hit Christmas single "Christmas is Just Around the Corner."

O'Connor was the composer, songwriter and musical director for all 14 seasons of the hit sketch comedy show Mad TV, David Allen Grier’s comedy series Chocolate News, Jeff Foxworthy’s variety show Blue Collar TV and Bob Einstein’s series Super Dave Spike-Tacular. Additionally, he was the musical director and composer for the ABC reality competition series The Next Best Thing.

O'Connor wrote and produced two songs for the film The Greening of Whitney Brown, starring Kris Kristofferson, Aiden Quinn and Brooke Shields, one of which was performed by Shields. He wrote and produced three featured songs for Lori Petty’s directorial feature film debut, The Poker House, as well as two featured songs in the Lego movie Clutch Powers. O'Connor produced and wrote songs for the animated Lionsgate movie Foodfight and produced two songs for Curb Records artist Kimberley Locke on the Camille soundtrack for Oscar-winning producer Al Ruddy.

O'Connor wrote all the opening songs for the ABC summer series Greatest Hits, produced by Grammy producer Kenneth Ehrlich. He also composed all the music for a reboot of Mad TV on the CW. He wrote the theme song for the series Gay Skit Happens with two members of the Grammy winning vocal group Pentatonix. In the science fiction thriller genre, O'Connor also scored the virtual reality series Defrost, directed by Randal Kleiser, which is one of the first long form dramatic series in this new groundbreaking genre. O'Connor co-wrote the theme song with actor Will Sasso for his Ten Minute Podcast starring Will, Chris D’Elia and Bryan Callan.

Greg scored the animated feature film Bobbleheads The Movie for Universal Pictures and co-wrote 4 songs for the film. Greg wrote the featured “Laura Dern” song for the 2020 Film Independent Spirit Awards that instantly went viral, and was featured in every major publication and news outlet.  He composed the main title theme for the newly released Disney+ series Prop Culture. In 2020, Greg composed the company logo music for House of Paine Entertainment for Academy Awards producer Rob Paine as well as the logo for Threshold Entertainment for producer Lawrence Kasanoff. Greg composed the theme song for The Caliendo Cast for actor comedian Frank Caliendo.

Awards

References

External links
Official Website

LinkedIn Profile

American male composers
21st-century American composers
Living people
Year of birth missing (living people)
21st-century American male musicians